The Naval Order of the United States was established in 1890 as a hereditary organization in the United States for members of the American sea services.  Its primary mission is to encourage research and writing on naval and maritime subjects and preserve documents, portraits, and other records of prominent figures, deeds and memories of American naval and maritime history.

History
The Naval Order of the United States traces its origin to the initiative of Charles Calhoun Philbrook, Charles Frederick Bacon Philbrook, and Franklin Senter Frisbie, who met in Boston, Massachusetts, on 4 July 1890 to take the first step toward establishing an organization that was originally named the Naval Commandery of the United States of America. Its purpose was to commemorate the seagoing services of their ancestors' naval service.  The original eligibility for membership was based upon service "in any of the wars or in any battle in which the United States Navy or Marine Corps has participated, or who served as above in connection with the Revenue or Privateer Services."  Four months later, on the 115th anniversary of the U.S. Marine Corps, 10 November 1890, the organization was established on a permanent basis and branches were established in several states. Three years later on 19 July 1893, the Naval Commandery began discussions with a smaller organization that had similar aims: the Naval Legion of the United States. The result of these talks resulted in the formal merger of the two organizations as the Naval Order of the United States. The formal meeting of the new and expanded organization took place on 15 August 1893 at Faneuil Hall, Boston, where the Naval Order adopted its constitution that created local commanderies in the various states with members becoming Companions of the Naval Order.

Membership Criteria
Regular Members - Any United States citizen, who has served or is serving as an officer or enlisted member of the United States Navy, U.S. Marine Corps, the U.S. Coast Guard and any other federal military maritime service of the United States or its allies and their descendants over 18 years of age, who are US citizens.
Associate Members - Spouses of present and deceased regular members, and those, other than United States citizens, who have served or are serving honorably as commissioned officers in an allied seagoing service. Also, the Naval Order may confer either associate or honorary membership upon individuals who are not otherwise eligible for regular or associate membership, if they have distinguished themselves in the interest of naval service.

National Awards by the Order

The Order presents a number of annual awards as part of its furtherance of its mission, including three awards to the U. S. Naval Academy midshipmen who score the highest in competitive examinations on national and international political science issues; an award to the outstanding graduate of the Chief of Naval Air Training Command Flight Officer program; awards to the outstanding midshipmen and cadets at the U.S. Merchant Marine Academy, at the State University of New York Maritime College, the California Maritime Academy, and at Naval Reserve Officer Training Corps programs at various universities, as well as  an award to the outstanding junior officer instructor at the U.S. Coast Guard Academy.

The Naval Order’s most prestigious awards are: 
 Admiral of the Navy George Dewey Award
 Distinguished Sea Service Award

Awards by Local Commanderies
 Samuel Eliot Morison Award for Naval Literature, awarded by the New York Commandery
 Admiral Nimitz Leadership Award, awarded by the Texas Commandery

Commanders-General of the Naval Order of the United States
The Commanders-General of the Naval Order of the United States have been:

 Charles Calhoun Philbrook, 1890–1893
 Lieutenant Commander John Codman Soley, 1893–1895
 Rear Admiral John Grimes Walker, 1895–1907
 Admiral of the Navy George Dewey, 1907-1917
 Rear Admiral Francis J. Higginson, 1917-1925
 Captain Herbert Livingston Satterlee, 1925-1928
 Rear Admiral Albert Gleaves, 1928-1931
 Rear Admiral Reginald R. Belknap, 1931-1937
 Commander Frederick Bernard Craven, 1937-1943
 Captain James Harvey Tomb, 1943-1946
 Vice Admiral William Augustus Read, 1946-1949
 Commander Charles Hann, Jr., 1949-1958
 Rear Admiral Thurston H. James, 1958-1961
 Captain Douglas Wilson Dodge, 1962-1964
 Captain Jeremiah Francis O'Shea, 1964-1966
 Admiral Joseph James Clark, 1966-1969
 Captain Robert Granville Burke, 1969-1971
 Captain Malcolm Townsend Munger, 1971-1973
 Rear Admiral Alban Weber,
 Captain Robert Bashford Bolt,
 Captain Edward Sydney Anderson,
 Captain Albert Frederick Kempe,
 Lieutenant Commander Raymond Edward Cross,
 Rear Admiral Winston Holbrook Weese,
 Commander Stanley John Majka,
 Captain Federick Daniel Carl,
 Captain John Charles Rice, Jr.,
 Captain Wallace Howard Lloyd, Jr.,
 Captain William Richard Bremer,
 Rear Admiral William Firman Merlin,
 Captain James Franklin Brooke III,
 Rear Admiral Lester Robert Smith,
 Rear Admiral Thomas Francis Brown, III
 Captain Fred Case Hawkins, Jr.
 Captain Carter Barry Conlin
 Captain Kenneth Albin Johnson
 Captain Gregory F. Streeter, 2009–2011
 Rear Admiral Douglas M. Moore, Jr., 2011–2013
 Captain Vance H. Morrison, 2013–2015
 Captain Michele Lockwood, USN, 2015–2017
 Captain Paul H. Crissy, USCG, 2017–2019
 Colonel Allan F.P. Cruz, USMC, 2020–2021

Notable Companions of the Naval Order of the United States
Members of the Naval Order have included Presidents, members of the Cabinet, and high-ranking naval and marine officers. Civilian companions have included:
 Bishop William Stevens Perry, no. 50 - Episcopal Bishop of Iowa
 Professor Robert G. Albion, no. 3322
 Loyall Farragut - son of Admiral David Farragut
 Professor E. B. Potter, no. 5793
 Dr. William S. Dudley, no. 7336
 Mr. Howland H. Pell, Jr., no. 694
 Dr. Mark Felton
 Tory Bruno, no. 7846, CEO of United Launch Alliance

References

External sources

 Official Website of the Naval Order of the United States

United States Navy support organizations
Lineage societies
American veterans' organizations
Organizations established in 1890
Organizations based in St. Petersburg, Florida